Monika Kadlecová (born ) is a female  road cyclist from Slovakia. She became national road race champion in 2013 and 2014.

References

External links
 

Slovak female cyclists
Living people
1990 births
Place of birth missing (living people)